The Tshwane Open was a golf tournament played since 2013 in Gauteng Province, South Africa. It was played at Copperleaf Golf & Country Estate in Centurion, South Africa in 2013 and 2014 and moved to Pretoria Country Club in Waterkloof in 2015. It was a co-sanctioned event by the Sunshine Tour and the European Tour. On 30 October 2018, the European Tour released their 2019 schedule, and it was noted that the Tshwane Open was no longer a co-sanctioned event by the European Tour, with no confirmation of the event's status by the Sunshine Tour.

Winners

Notes

References

External links 
 Coverage on European Tour's official site

Former Sunshine Tour events
Former European Tour events
Golf tournaments in South Africa
Sport in Pretoria
Recurring sporting events established in 2013
2013 establishments in South Africa